Lermontov is an impact crater on the planet Mercury.  The crater is named after Mikhail Yuryevich Lermontov, a 19th-century Russian poet. The name was approved by the International Astronomical Union in 1976.

The crater floor is somewhat brighter than the exterior surface and is smooth with several irregularly shaped depressions. Such features, similar to those found on the floor of Praxiteles, may be evidence of past explosive volcanic activity on the crater floor. Lermontov appears reddish in enhanced-color views, suggesting that it has a different composition from the surrounding surface.

To the north of Lermontov are Proust and Bek craters.  To the south is Chaikovskij, and to the southwest is Giotto.

Views

References

External links
Kuiper quadrangle maps

Impact craters on Mercury
Mikhail Lermontov